The Division of McPherson is an Australian Electoral Division in Queensland.

Geography
Since 1984, federal electoral division boundaries in Australia have been determined at redistributions by a redistribution committee appointed by the Australian Electoral Commission. Redistributions occur for the boundaries of divisions in a particular state, and they occur every seven years, or sooner if a state's representation entitlement changes or when divisions of a state are malapportioned.

History

The division was created in 1948 and is named after the McPherson Range, which forms one of the divisional boundaries. McPherson is located in south-east Queensland, and originally included the entire Gold Coast region, stretching as far as the Scenic Rim and Southern Downs.  However, the area's dramatic population growth has seen the seat shrink with successive redistributions, culminating in 1983, when most of its northern portion became Moncrieff.

McPherson now incorporates the southern portion of the Gold Coast, including Coolangatta, Burleigh Heads, Tugun and Palm Beach.

It has always been held by a conservative party. Indeed, most of the area has been represented by centre-right MPs without interruption since 1906; before 1949, most of the Gold Coast was part of Moreton. Originally a Country Party bastion, urbanisation has turned it into a Liberal stronghold.

Members

Election results

References

External links
 Division of McPherson (Qld) — Australian Electoral Commission

Electoral divisions of Australia
Constituencies established in 1949
1949 establishments in Australia
Federal politics in Queensland